Bill Griffith (12 December 1905 – 27 August 1994) was  a former Australian rules footballer who played with Richmond in the Victorian Football League (VFL).

Notes

External links 
		

1905 births
1994 deaths
Australian rules footballers from Victoria (Australia)
Richmond Football Club players